Kunert is a German surname. Notable people include:

 Andrzej Kunert (born 1952), Polish historian and lecturer
 Gerhard Kunert (1920–1944), German Unteroffizier and Knight's Cross of the Iron Cross recipient
 Günter Kunert (1929–2019), German writer
 Hans Kunert, Knight's Cross of the Iron Cross recipient
 Heinz Kunert, (1927–2012), German engineer and inventor
 Joachim Kunert (born 1929), German film director and screenwriter
 Martin Kunert (born 1974), feature film and television writer, director and producer
 Rudolf Kunert, Knight's Cross of the Iron Cross recipient
 Timo Kunert (born 1987), German footballer 

German-language surnames